East is one of the four multi-member constituencies of the Chamber of Deputies, the national legislature of Luxembourg. The constituency was established in 1919 following the introduction of proportional representation for elections to the Chamber of Deputies. It consists of the cantons of Echternach, Grevenmacher and Remich. The constituency currently elects seven of the 60 members of the Chamber of Deputies using the open party-list proportional representation electoral system. At the 2018 general election it had 36,595 registered electors.

Electoral system
East currently elects seven of the 60 members of the Chamber of Deputies using the open party-list proportional representation electoral system. Electors votes for candidates rather than parties and may cast as many votes as the number of deputies to be elected from the constituency. They may vote for an entire party list or individual candidates and may cast up to two votes for an individual candidate. If the party list contains fewer candidates than the number of deputies to be elected, the elector may vote for candidates from other lists as long as their total number of votes does not exceed the number of deputies to be elected. The ballot paper is invalidated if the elector cast more votes than the number of deputies to be elected from the constituency. Split-ticket voting (panachage) is permitted.

The votes received by each party's candidates are aggregated and seats are allocated to each party using the Hagenbach-Bischoff quota.

Election results

Summary

Detailed

2010s

2018
Results of the 2018 general election held on 14 October 2018:

The following candidates were elected:
Gilles Baum (DP), 7,299 votes; Lex Delles (DP), 10,396 votes; Carole Dieschbourg (DG), 9,752 votes; Léon Gloden (CSV), 9,754 votes; Françoise Hetto (CSV), 12,150 votes; Octavie Modert (CSV), 10,222 votes; and Nicolas Schmit (LSAP), 5,522 votes.

2013
Results of the 2013 general election held on 20 October 2013:

The following candidates were elected:
Lex Delles (DP), 5,338 votes; Léon Gloden (CSV), 10,612 votes; Françoise Hetto (CSV), 14,281 votes; Henri Kox (DG), 6,271 votes; Octavie Modert (CSV), 11,485 votes; Maggy Nagel (DP), 7,103 votes; and Nicolas Schmit (LSAP), 5,070 votes.

2000s

2009
Results of the 2009 general election held on 7 June 2009:

The following candidates were elected:
Fernand Boden (CSV), 11,629 votes; Marie-Josée Frank (CSV), 11,534 votes; Françoise Hetto (CSV), 11,776 votes; Henri Kox (DG), 7,551 votes; Octavie Modert (CSV), 12,728 votes; Nicolas Schmit (LSAP), 7,653 votes; and Carlo Wagner (DP), 5,787 votes.

2004
Results of the 2004 general election held on 13 June 2004:

The following candidates were elected:
Fernand Boden (CSV), 13,652 votes; Lucien Clement (CSV), 9,045 votes; Henri Kox (DG), 4,972 votes; Robert Mehlen (ADR), 5,528 votes; Octavie Modert (CSV), 9,064 votes; Jos Scheuer (LSAP), 6,453 votes; and Carlo Wagner (DP), 7,999 votes.

1990s

1999
Results of the 1999 general election held on 13 June 1999:

The following candidates were elected:
Fernand Boden (CSV), 9,492 votes; Lucien Clement (CSV), 7,234 votes; Marie-Josée Frank (CSV), 6,630 votes; Robert Mehlen (ADR), 5,692 votes; Maggy Nagel (DP), 5,535 votes; Jos Scheuer (LSAP), 5,501 votes; and Carlo Wagner (DP), 6,454 votes.

1994
Results of the 1994 general election held on 12 June 1994:

The following candidates were elected:
Fernand Boden (CSV), 9,441 votes; Norbert Konter (CSV), 7,977 votes; Robert Mehlen (ADR), 4,641 votes; Jos Scheuer (LSAP), 6,568 votes; Marcel Schlechter (LSAP), 7,039 votes; Nicolas Strotz (CSV), 7,025 votes; and Carlo Wagner (DP), 5,538 votes.

1980s

1989
Results of the 1989 general election held on 18 June 1989:

The following candidates were elected:
Fernand Boden (CSV), 9,817 votes; Robert Gitzinger (DP), 4,507 votes; Fernand Kons (CSV), 6,882 votes; Norbert Konter (CSV), 7,061 votes; Robert Mehlen (5/6), 3,452 votes; Jos Scheuer (LSAP), 7,091 votes; and Marcel Schlechter (LSAP), 7,822 votes.

1984
Results of the 1984 general election held on 17 June 1984:

The following candidates were elected:
Fernand Boden (CSV), 12,931 votes; Victor Braun (DP), 6,284 votes; Paul Helminger (DP), 7,914 votes; Marcel Schlechter (LSAP), 6,880 votes; Aly Schroeder (LSAP), 5,771 votes; Jean-Pierre Urwald (CSV), 8,017 votes; and Paul Wagener (CSV), 8,038 votes.

1970s

1979
Results of the 1979 general election held on 10 June 1979:

The following candidates were elected:
Fernand Boden (CSV), 10,938 votes; Victor Braun (DP), 5,141 votes; Marcel Schlechter (LSAP), 3,949 votes; Jean-Pierre Urwald (CSV), 8,931 votes; Paul Wagener (CSV), 7,502 votes; and Charles Wagner (DP), 5,360 votes.

1974
Results of the 1974 general election held on 26 May 1974:

The following candidates were elected:
Jean-Pierre Büchler (CSV), 8,137 votes; Georges Hurt (SDP), 5,205 votes; Robert Schaffner (DP), 6,582 votes; Marcel Schlechter (LSAP), 3,880 votes; Jean-Pierre Urwald (CSV), 8,436 votes; and Charles Wagner (DP), 6,505 votes.

1960s

1968
Results of the 1968 general election held on 15 December 1968:

The following candidates were elected:
Jean-Pierre Büchler (CSV), 9,409 votes; Aloyse Duhr (CSV), 8,153 votes; Georges Hurt (LSAP), 5,238 votes; Fernand Kons (CSV), 8,723 votes; Robert Schaffner (DP), 5,716 votes; and Charles Wagner (DP), 5,348 votes.

1964
Results of the 1964 general election held on 7 June 1964:

The following candidates were elected:
Victor Bodson (LSAP), 5,195 votes; Aloyse Duhr (CSV), 9,001 votes; Georges Hurt (LSAP), 5,288 votes; Fernand Kons (CSV), 8,490 votes; Robert Schaffner (DP), 4,830 votes; and Émile Schaus (CSV), 8,251 votes.

1950s

1959
Results of the 1959 general election held on 1 February 1959:

The following candidates were elected:
Joseph Bech (CSV), 11,676 votes; Othon Decker (LSAP), 4,916 votes; Aloyse Duhr (CSV), 9,055 votes; Robert Schaffner (DP), 7,911 votes; Guillaume Speck (CSV), 8,752 votes; and Charles Wagner (DP), 6,984 votes.

1954
Results of the 1954 general election held on 30 May 1954:

The following candidates were elected:
Joseph Bech (CSV), 14,038 votes; Othon Decker (LSAP), 5,156 votes; Aloyse Duhr (CSV), 9,925 votes; Robert Schaffner (GD), 5,757 votes; Guillaume Speck (CSV), 10,036 votes; and Nicolas Thill (CSV), 10,518 votes.

1940s

1948
Results of the 1948 general election held on 6 June 1948:

The following candidates were elected:
Joseph Bech (CSV), 12,203 votes; Othon Decker (LSAP), 6,027 votes; Nicolas Leonardy (CSV), 8,514 votes; Robert Schaffner (GPD), 10,232 votes; Guillaume Speck (CSV), 9,309 votes; and Charles Wagner (GPD), 4,920 votes.

1945
Results of the 1945 general election held on 21 October 1945:

The following candidates were elected:
Joseph Bech (CSV), 15,064 votes; Othon Decker (OO), 6,027 votes; Aloyse Duhr (CSV), 9,736 votes; Robert Schaffner (GPD), 6,077 votes; Guillaume Speck (CSV), 11,077 votes; and Nicolas Thill (CSV), 10,127 votes.

1930s

1934
Results of the 1934 general election held on 3 June 1934:

The following candidates were elected:
Joseph Bech (RP), 15,211 votes; Othon Decker (OL), 10,149 votes; Jean-Baptiste Didier (RP), 10,441 votes; Pierre Godart (OL), 10,020 votes; Auguste Keiffer (OL), 10,064 votes; Adolphe Klein (RP), 11,101 votes; and Mathias Schaffner (RP), 10,629 votes.

1920s

1928
Results of the 1928 general election held on 3 June 1928:

The following candidates were elected:
Joseph Bech (RP), 16,222 votes; Jean-Baptiste Didier (RP), 10,806 votes; Pierre Godart (OL), 7,838 votes; Auguste Keiffer (OL), 7,732 votes; Adolphe Klein (RP), 11,588 votes; Mathias Schaffner (RP), 10,280 votes; and Jean-Pierre Wiltzius (RP), 10,152 votes.

1925
Results of the 1925 general election held on 1 March 1925:

The following candidates were elected:
Joseph Bech (RP), 12,316 votes; Othon Decker (OL), 7,761 votes; Jean-Baptiste Didier (RP), 10,030 votes; Pierre Godart (OL), 8,585 votes; Mathias Huss (RP), 9,983 votes; Adolphe Klein (RP), 10,758 votes; and Jean-Pierre Wiltzius (RP), 9,322 votes.

1910s

1919
Results of the 1919 general election held on 26 October 1919:

The following candidates were elected:
Joseph Bech (RP), 13,369 votes; Othon Decker (K), 4,900 votes; Lamoral de Villers (RP), 12,348 votes; Albert Dühr (RP), 13,215 votes; Mathias Huss (RP), 12,929 votes; Adolphe Klein (RP), 12,703 votes; and Auguste Thorn (RP), 13,564 votes.

References

1919 establishments in Luxembourg
Chamber of Deputies (Luxembourg) constituencies
Constituencies established in 1919
Chamber of Deputies constituency
Chamber of Deputies constituency
Chamber of Deputies constituency